The Miramichi Bridge is a bridge crossing the Miramichi River at Newcastle, New Brunswick, Canada.Locals call it the "new" Bridge. The Miramichi. bridge is not to be confused with the Centennial Bridge located in Miramichi. 

It opened to traffic in 1995 as part of the Route 117 Chatham bypass project.

The bridge is a continuous steel girder design carrying two lanes of highway traffic from Chatham Head on the south bank to Newcastle on the north bank.

See also 
 List of bridges in Canada

External links 

Road bridges in New Brunswick
Buildings and structures in Miramichi, New Brunswick
Transport in Miramichi, New Brunswick